Alfond Stadium may refer to:

Alfond Stadium (Rollins College), Winter Park, Florida
Alfond Stadium (University of Maine), Orono, Maine